The 2016–17 Taça da Liga was the tenth edition of the Taça da Liga, a football cup competition organized by the Liga Portuguesa de Futebol Profissional (LPFP) and contested exclusively by clubs competing in the top two professional tiers of Portuguese football. The competition was sponsored by CTT and, therefore, was known as Taça CTT for a second season.

A total of 35 teams contested the tournament, including 18 teams from the 2016–17 Primeira Liga and 17 non-reserve teams from the 2016–17 LigaPro. The competition format suffered changes for the second consecutive year, with the number of teams being reduced and the semi-finals being played on the same week of the final, in late January.

Benfica were the three-time defending holders but failed to defend their title, losing to Moreirense in the semi-finals. This result marked Benfica's first defeat in the competition since 31 October 2007 and put an end to a 42-game unbeaten run. Moreirense beat Braga 1–0 to win their first domestic cup in their first ever appearance in a cup final.

Format 
On 19 June 2015, the LPFP announced that the number of teams in the 2016–17 LigaPro season would be reduced to 22, thus reducing the number of teams that would play in the Taça da Liga from 37 to 35.

On 28 June 2016, the LPFP approved some changes in relation to the semi-finals matches. Both the semi-finals and final match will be played in the same week, and on the same stadium.

Seventeen teams competing in the 2016–17 LigaPro (reserve teams from Primeira Liga clubs are excluded) took part in the first round; one-legged ties were played between sixteen teams, with the seventeenth team receiving a bye to the next round.

In the second round, the nine teams advancing from the previous round (eight winners plus the team with a bye) were joined by the twelve teams placed 5th–16th in the 2015–16 Primeira Liga and by the two teams promoted to 2016–17 Primeira Liga. Again, one-legged ties were played between 22 teams, with the 23rd team receiving a bye to the next round.

The third round featured the twelve teams advancing from the previous round (eleven winners plus the team with a bye) and the four best-placed teams in the 2015–16 Primeira Liga. The sixteen teams were drawn into four groups that were contested in a single round-robin format, with each team playing at least one game at home. The four group winners qualified for the semi-finals, which were played as single-legged ties. The semi-finals and final were played at a neutral venue.

Tiebreakers 

In the third round, teams are ranked according to points (3 points for a win, 1 point for a draw, 0 points for a loss). If two or more teams are tied on points on completion of the group matches, the following criteria are applied to determine the rankings:
highest goal difference in all group matches;
highest number of scored goals in all group matches;
lowest average age of all players fielded in all group matches (sum of the ages of all fielded players divided by the number of fielded players).

In all other rounds, teams tied at the end of regular time contest a penalty shootout to determine the winner.

Teams 
Thirty-five teams competing in the two professional tiers of Portuguese football for the 2016–17 season are eligible to participate in this competition. For Primeira Liga teams, the final league position in the previous season determined in which round they enter the competition.

Key
Nth: League position in the 2015–16 season
P1: Promoted to the Primeira Liga
P2: Promoted to the LigaPro
R1: Relegated to the LigaPro

Schedule 
All draws were held at the LPFP headquarters in Porto, except for the draw for the first and second rounds, which took place in Santa Maria da Feira.

First round
The 17 non-reserve teams competing in the 2016–17 LigaPro entered the competition in this round. Sixteen teams were paired against each other for eight single-legged ties, while the seventeenth team (Académico de Viseu) was given a bye to the next round. The draw took place on 15 July 2016, and matches were played on 30 and 31 July 2016.

Second round
In the second round, the eight first-round winners and Académico de Viseu, who were given a bye to this round, joined the 12 teams ranked 5th–16th in the 2015–16 Primeira Liga and the two teams promoted from the 2015–16 LigaPro. Twenty-two teams were paired against each other for eleven single-legged ties, while the 23rd team (Vitória de Guimarães) was given a bye to the next round. The draw took place on 15 July 2016, and matches were played on 8, 9, 25, 26 and 27 October 2016.

Third round
In the third round, the 11 second-round winners and Vitória de Guimarães joined the four top-ranked teams from the 2015–16 Primeira Liga: Benfica (1st), Sporting CP (2nd), Porto (3rd) and Braga (4th). These 16 teams were drawn into four groups of four, each group containing one of the four top-ranked Primeira Liga teams. Group matches were played in a single round-robin format, ensuring that each team played at least one match at home. The draw took place on 9 November 2016, and matches were played on 29 November–1 December, 29–30 December 2016, 2–4 January and 10–11 January 2017.

Group A

Group B

Group C

Group D

Knockout phase
In the knockout phase, the four teams advancing from the third round contested one-legged semi-final matches for a place in the competition final. The winners of Groups A and B played the winners of Groups C and D, respectively. The semi-finals were played on 25 and 26 January, and the final was played on 29 January 2017. All knockout phase matches were played at Estádio Algarve, in Faro/Loulé.

Semi-finals

Final

Notes

References

External links
 LPFP page 

Taça da Liga
Taca da Liga
Taca da Liga